The men's 110 metres hurdles was a track and field athletics event held as part of the Athletics at the 1912 Summer Olympics programme. The competition was held on Thursday, July 11, 1912, and on Friday, July 12, 1912. 22 hurdlers from 10 nations competed. NOCs could enter up to 12 athletes. The event was won by Fred Kelly of the United States, the fifth of five consecutive victories for the nation in the first five Olympic Games. It was also the fourth of four consecutive podium sweeps for the Americans in the event.

Background

This was the fifth appearance of the event, which is one of 12 athletics events to have been held at every Summer Olympics. None of the finalists from 1908 returned. The American hurdles were favored, with Fred Kelly, John Case, and Vaughn Blanchard the Olympic trial winners.

Chile, Finland, and Italy each made their first appearance in the event. The United States made its fifth appearance, the only nation to have competed in the 110 metres hurdles in each Games to that point.

Competition format

As in 1908, there were three rounds. The first round consisted of 11 heats, many of which had only one or two hurdlers and none of which had more than three. The top two hurdlers in each heat advanced to the semifinals, resulting in only two men being eliminated in the first round. The 22 semifinalists were divided into six semifinals of 3 or 4 runners each; only the top hurdler in each advanced to the 6-man final.

Records

The records for the 110 metre hurdles coming into 1912 were 15.0 seconds, which were not matched during the 1912 Games.

Schedule

Results

Heats

All heats were held on Thursday, July 11, 1912.

Only two hurdlers were eliminated after the heats.

Heat 1

Heat 2

Heat 3

Heat 4

Heat 5

Heat 6

Heat 7

Heat 8

Heat 9

Heat 10

Heat 11

Semifinals

All semifinals were held on Thursday, July 11, 1912.

Semifinal 1

Semifinal 2

Semifinal 3

Semifinal 4

Semifinal 5

Semifinal 6

Final

The final was held on Friday, July 12, 1912. Nicholson fell at the eighth hurdle, leaving Kelly to hold on and win by a narrow margin over Wendell.

References

Notes
 
 

Men's hurdles 110 metres
Sprint hurdles at the Olympics